Grenoble is a city in France.

Grenoble may also refer to:

 Arrondissement of Grenoble
 Grenoble metropolitan area
 Grenoble station, the main railway station in Grenoble
 Grenoble Foot 38, an association football club
 FC Grenoble, a rugby union club
 FC Grenoble (basketball), 1920–1945

Other uses
 Grenoble station (Pennsylvania), a defunct railway station in Northampton Township, Pennsylvania, US
 Lenore Grenoble, American linguist